Kahlo is a German surname. Notable people with the surname include:

Cristina Kahlo (1908–1964), daughter of Guillermo and sister of Frida Kahlo
Frida Kahlo (1907–1954), Mexican artist
Guillermo Kahlo (1871–1941), German-Mexican architect and photographer, father of Frida and Cristina

See also

Karlo (name)

German-language surnames